The white-throated shrike-tanager (Lanio leucothorax) is a species of bird in the family Thraupidae. It is found in Costa Rica, Honduras, Nicaragua, and Panama. Its natural habitat is subtropical or tropical moist lowland forests.

References

white-throated shrike-tanager
Birds of Honduras
Birds of Nicaragua
Birds of Costa Rica
Birds of Panama
white-throated shrike-tanager
white-throated shrike-tanager
Taxonomy articles created by Polbot